SDSS may refer to:

 Sloan Digital Sky Survey, a major multi-filter imaging and spectroscopic redshift survey
 Social Democratic Party of Slovakia
 Spatial Decision Support System, a GIS based decision aiding system
 Independent Democratic Serb Party, a political party of Croatian Serbs (Samostalna demokratska srpska stranka in Serbo-Croatian)
 South Delta Secondary School, a school in Delta, British Columbia, Canada